Metrolink stations may refer to:

List of Metrolink (Southern California) stations
List of MetroLink (St. Louis) stations
List of Manchester Metrolink stations